John Nicholas Brown may refer to:
 John Nicholas Brown I (1861–1900), American book collector 
 John Nicholas Brown II (1900–1979), United States Assistant Secretary of the Navy